Gelincik is a village in the Mazgirt District, Tunceli Province, Turkey. The village is populated by Kurds of the Bamasur tribe and had a population of 52 in 2021.

The hamlets of Hasan, Karataş and Seyitkan are attached to the village.

References 

Villages in Mazgirt District
Kurdish settlements in Tunceli Province